Turiška Vas is a small village in the Mislinja Valley in the City Municipality of Slovenj Gradec in northern Slovenia. The area is part of the traditional region of Styria. The entire municipality is now included in the Carinthia Statistical Region.

Notable people
Notable people that were born or lived in Turiška Vas include the following:
Jerica Mrzel (born 1945), actress, singer, and politician

References

External links
Turiška Vas at Geopedia

Populated places in the City Municipality of Slovenj Gradec
Slovenj Gradec